The Public Research Centre Henri Tudor (or CRP Henri Tudor) is a Luxembourg-based research institute. Created in late 1987, in the framework of the Luxembourgish law of 9 March 1987 about public research, the CRP Henri Tudor took its name from Henri Owen Tudor, a famous Luxembourgish engineer.

CRP Henri Tudor's main mission was to contribute to the improvement and the strengthening of the innovation capacities of enterprises and public organizations. On 1 January 2015, the Public Research Centre Henri Tudor and the Public Research Center Gabriel Lippmann merged to form a new Research and Technology Organization (RTO), the Luxembourg Institute of Science and Technology.

Activities and services
Applied, experimental and doctoral research; development of tools, methods, labels, certifications and standards; technological assistance, consulting and watch services; knowledge and competence transfer; incubation of high-tech companies as well as training and high-level qualification were part of CRP Henri Tudor's scope of activities.

Competence domains
With the signature of the Performance Contract 2008–2010 with the Luxembourgish State, CRP Henri Tudor's activities were oriented towards five scientific and technological fields:
 Information and Communication Technologies (ICT)
 Environmental Technologies
 Health Care Technologies
 Materials Technologies
 Business Organisation and Management

Departments
Departments of the Public Research Centre Henri Tudor were:
 Resource Centre for Environmental Technologies (CRTE)
 Resource Centre for Health Care Technologies (CR SANTEC)
 Resource Centre for Technologies and Innovation in Construction (CRTI-B)
 SITec®, Knowledge Transfer & Training Centre
 Technology Watch Centre (CVT)
 High-tech business incubator Technoport®
 Advanced Materials & Structures (AMS)
 Service Science & Innovation (SSI)

See also
 Tudor IT Process Assessment, a method for assessment of IT processes

External links

 
 

Research institutes in Luxembourg
Government research